Kõrgessaare is a small borough in Hiiumaa Parish, Hiiu County, Estonia, on the northwestern coast of Hiiumaa island.

References

Boroughs and small boroughs in Estonia
Kreis Wiek
Populated places in Hiiu County